Algoma University, commonly shortened to Algoma U or Algoma, is a public university with its main campus located in Sault Ste. Marie, Ontario, Canada. With a particular focus on the needs of Northern Ontario, Algoma U is a teaching-focused and student-centred post-secondary institution, specializing in liberal arts, sciences, management and professional degree programs. Located on the former site of the Shingwauk Indian Residential School, Algoma U has a special mission to provide and cultivate cross-cultural learning between Aboriginal populations and other communities. Algoma U also offers satellite programming in Brampton and Timmins, Ontario.

From its founding in 1965 until June 18, 2008, Algoma U was an affiliated college of Laurentian University in Sudbury and was officially known as Algoma University College. The enabling legislation is the Algoma University Act, 2008.

History

Shingwauk Hall: From "Teaching Wigwam" to residential school

The original vision for Shingwauk Hall in the early 19th century came from  Chief Shingwauk, the chief of the Garden River Ojibway people, as he felt "that the future Ojibway needed to learn the white man's academic method of education in order to survive in what was becoming a 'predominately non-native world with non-native values'". While Chief Shingwauk's vision of a teaching wigwam for his people would not come to fruition in his lifetime, a residential school would eventually receive funding in 1872 from the combined efforts of Chiefs Augustin Shingwauk and Buhkwujjenene Shingwauk (Chief Shingwauk's sons) and the Anglican Missionary, Rev. Edward Francis Wilson.
The initial building was constructed in Garden River First Nation in 1873 and housed 16 students. It tragically burnt down 6 days later. A new building was erected in Sault Ste. Marie in 1875. The residential school was designed to provide religious instruction and occupational training for First Nation, Inuit and Métis youth.

Shingwauk Hall would eventually become part of the broader residential school system across Canada designed to assimilate Canada's Indigenous peoples, straying far from Chief Shingwauk's vision for a teaching wigwam. Students in the residential school system endured poor living conditions, physical and emotional abuse and segregation from their own family members.

Shingwauk Hall, presently the main building of Algoma University College, was erected in 1935 after it was deemed the Shingwauk Home original building had deteriorated beyond repair.  Shingwauk Hall ceased operation as a residential school in 1970.

Algoma University College to Algoma University
The desire to establish an undergraduate liberal arts college in Sault Ste. Marie originated as a broad citizens' movement in the 1950s. In October 1964, the Algoma College Association was incorporated by letters patent of the Province of Ontario. One year later, on 17 December 1965, Algoma University College was established as a non-sectarian institution affiliated with Laurentian University after the Affiliation Agreement was signed. In September 1967, Algoma University College began offering courses to its first 77 students at what is today Sault College, formally then known as Cambrian College, under the leadership of Principal Reverend Charles A. Krug (1966–68). The majority of students studying at Algoma University College were mature or "extension" students looking to enhance their post-secondary education by taking first-year Bachelor of Arts (BA) or Bachelor of Science (BSc) courses.

Part-time enrolment expanded to over 1000 students by 1969–1970. The year 1971 marked a significant turning point in Algoma University College's history in respect to both program and facilities. In May, in recognition of the rapid maturation of the post-secondary institution, the Department of University Affairs approved Algoma University College's request to offer second-and third-year level courses, thereby giving the institution the ability to offer full-time, three-year programming in Bachelor of Arts degrees. In addition, in September 1971, the Algoma University College was relocated to a new site, acquiring by lease Shingwauk Hall and the former Shingwauk Indian Residential School site. Algoma University College would later purchase Shingwauk Hall.

By purchasing Shingwauk Hall, tensions arose between university members, the community, and the First Nations population. A curriculum was proposed to soothe and entrench understanding and demonstrate Algoma University College's commitment to cross-cultural learning and diversity. The Shingwauk Project was founded in 1979, which laid the foundation for the reaffirmation of a positive and respectful relationship between the post-secondary institution and First Nations people. Algoma University College also received its own emblem, the Thunderbird, as designed by Dora de Pedery-Hunt in 1972.

Construction began to further enhance the new site of Algoma University College. In 1989, the Arthur A. Wishart Library opened, followed by the opening of the George Leach Centre in 1992. Student residence buildings were constructed in 1995 and 2001, and later in 2012. In 2005, a $6 million technology wing was opened, which included state-of-the-art technology and computer labs, the 'Great West Life Amphitheatre' (a 250+ seat lecture hall), a new student centre, cafeteria, faculty offices, a bookstore and campus shop, and a new pub. During this time, academic programming also expanded tenfold, with many of Algoma University College's programs earning their four-year, becoming Bachelor of Arts and Bachelor of Science honours programs.

On 19 May 2006, Algoma University College entered into a new relationship, which further entrenched its pre-existing relationship with First Nations people. Algoma University College and Shingwauk Education Trust (SET) / Shingwauk Kinoomaage Gamig (SKG) signed the Covenant, which demonstrated the two parties' agreement to work together alongside each other in the pursuit of their goals to provide quality education to Anishinaabe students and students of all cultural backgrounds.

Algoma's independence from Laurentian University was first proposed in 1994. The original proposal would have seen the school renamed 'Shingwauk University, but it was not ultimately pursued by the MTCU. 
On May 31, 2007, the government of Ontario announced that it would introduce legislation to charter Algoma University College as a fully independent university. After the government passed the Algoma University Act, it was given royal assent by David Onley, the Lieutenant Governor of Ontario, on June 18, 2008. On 13 July 2009, Algoma University conferred its first degrees as an independent university, with 60 students earning Algoma University degrees.

Programs
Algoma University offers more than 40 programs - three and four year bachelor's degrees in disciplines such as biology, business, computer science, community development, English, geography, history, psychology, social work, sociology, political science, music and fine arts.

It also offers about 9 undergraduate-certificate and graduate-certificate programs, one and two years certificates in disciplines such as Project Management, Information Technology, Human Management, Computing, Business, Health Science, and Software Development.

The university also offers extension programming in Timmins and Brampton.

Partnerships
The Algoma Conservatory of Music, which offers music lessons to about 1,000 students in the community, has a working relationship with Algoma.
Concurrently with Algoma's charter as an independent university, Shingwauk Kinoomaage Gamig, an Anishinaabe cultural and linguistic federated school opened in the fall of 2008.

The university has diploma-to-degree agreements with Cambrian College, Confederation College, George Brown College, Humber College, Mohawk College, Northern College, Sheridan College, Sault College and Seneca College, as well as a student exchange agreement with the University of the Sunshine Coast in Queensland, Australia.

Libraries and archives
The Arthur A. Wishart Library at Algoma University is a member of the Ontario Council of University Libraries and is a contributor to Open Content Alliance.

The Arthur A. Wishart Library manages two distinct archival repositories: the Engracia de Jesus Matias Archives and Special Collections and the Shingwauk Residential Schools Centre. The Engracia de Jesus Matias Archives and Special Collections is the official repository for records of Algoma University, the Anglican Diocese of Algoma and the Ecclesiastical Province of Ontario. The Engracia de Jesus Matias Archives and Special Collections strengths are in Northern Ontario business history, Algoma University institutional history, industrial history of the Great Lakes region and the history of the Algoma region more broadly.  The Shingwauk Residential Schools Centre (SRSC) is an archive jointly managed with the Children of Shingwauk Alumni Association which is dedicated to documenting the legacy of residential schools in Canada.  The SRSC holds one of the largest residential school archival collections in North America.

Main campus

Academic and administrative buildings

Shingwauk Hall and Adjacent Wings (East, West and North-West)

Shingwauk Hall is currently used to house various classrooms, as well as administrative and faculty offices. It is connected on the 1st, 2nd and 3rd levels by links to the newer East, West and North-West wings that house further classrooms, research space and offices. The second floor of Shingwauk Hall (SH200's) houses various student services, including Co-Op and Career Services, the Learning Center, Student Advisors and the ESL Program.

Convergence Centre
In 2009 Algoma received more than $16 million to build a biosciences and technology convergence centre.  Ground was broken for the new building in September 2009. Along with state-of-the-art classroom and laboratory space for students and professors, the building is home to various research institutes, including the Health Informatics Research Institute, the Invasive Species Research Institute, the Sault Ste. Marie Innovation Centre and Algoma Games for Health. The building opened its doors to students in September 2011 and was officially named the Convergence Centre in a ceremony including David Johnston, Governor General of Canada, in August 2012.

Athletics and recreation

George Leach Centre
The George Leach Centre (GLC), the home of the Algoma Thunderbirds, is located on the university's campus. Built in 1992, and named after Algoma University's first Athletics Director, the GLC provides Algoma University students and community members with access to fitness equipment.  The GLC also hosts regional, provincial, and national level competitions.

In March 2015, the GLC opened a new 10,000-square-foot expansion, in addition to its 39,000-square foot pre-existing structure. This new weight room fitness space features new strength and cardio equipment. These large spaces overlook the campus. One of these studios has also been converted into a Spin Studio with 15 new digital spin bikes.
 
The gymnasium, or field house, features three regulation court surfaces, which accommodate a wide range of athletic activities such as badminton, basketball, volleyball, and tennis. One court has been specially designed with a dimple surface for better tennis play. The gym area is surrounded by a 1/9th mile indoor walking and jogging track. The GLC also has a sauna, change rooms with lockers, varsity change rooms, and private change rooms for refereeing officials.

The Speakeasy
The Speakeasy is Algoma University's student centre. Attached to the cafeteria, The Speakeasy operates as a patio, pub, and entertainment hub. Planned evening events include: karaoke nights, acoustic jam and open mic nights, themed Thursday night pubs, live bands, comedy nights, and cultural dinners.

Residences

Dr. Lou Lukenda Dormitory
Built in September 2003, the facility contains 45 single bedrooms.

Spirit Village Townhouse
The entire complex consists of 15 townhouses, housing 75 students. Each townhouse unit has five single bedrooms, two bathrooms, a common kitchen and living room.

Algoma Dormitory
With construction starting in late 2011, a new residence building opened at Algoma University for the start of the 2012 school year. Housing over 96 students, Algoma Dormitory is furnished with an open concept area, a single bed, wardrobe and a desk with a high speed wireless internet connection. The student shares a bathroom with another roommate of the same sex. There is a shared common room on each floor of the complex with microwaves and HD TV with satellite.

Extension programming
Algoma University offers extension programming out of campuses in Timmins and Brampton. It formerly offered extension programming in St. Thomas, Ontario.

Business (Brampton)
Algoma University at Brampton offers accelerated Bachelor of Business Administration (BBA) degrees designed specifically for college graduates and mature students. Students can choose to pursue a general BBA or specialize in accounting, human resource management, or marketing. "Diploma-to-Degree" students may earn their degree in as little as 20 months. Algoma U at Brampton is located at the Market Square Business Centre at 24 Queen Street East in Downtown Brampton.

Social work and community development (Timmins) 
Algoma University at Timmins offers bachelor's degrees in Social Work and Community Development on the campus of Northern College. These programs are designed for diploma-to-degree or university transfer students.

Former St. Thomas programming
Algoma offered extension programming in St. Thomas, Ontario from September 2012 until April 2015.  The first two years of select Bachelor of Arts programs were offered under a block plan model, where students took one course at a time.  After their first two years, they were expected to move to Algoma U's main campus in Sault Ste. Marie.

Student life

The Algoma University Thunderbirds participate in the Ontario University Athletics (OUA) and Canadian Interuniversity Sport (CIS) conferences in the sports of basketball, soccer, cross-country running, curling, wrestling, and Nordic skiing. Prior to making the move to the OUA and CIS in 2013, the Algoma Thunderbirds competed in the Ontario Colleges Athletics Association (OCAA) in the sports of basketball, curling, and indoor soccer.

The university's student newspaper is The Sentient.

The students are represented by the Algoma University Students' Union (AUSU).  AUSU is local 82 of the Canadian Federation of Students. Anishinaabe students of Algoma University have an active Shingwauk Anishinaabe Students' Association (SASA) and are represented on the Algoma University Student Union executive, the Anishinaabe Peoples Council (an advisory committee of the Board of Governors) and the Cross Cultural Committee.

Algoma also publishes an annual literary journal, Algoma Ink.

See also

List of Ontario Universities
Ontario Student Assistance Program
Higher education in Ontario
Canadian government scientific research organizations
Canadian university scientific research organizations
Canadian industrial research and development organizations

References

External links

 Algoma University
 thunderbird six, the AU podcast
 Algoma University profile at the Association of Universities and Colleges of Canada

 
Buildings and structures in Sault Ste. Marie, Ontario
Educational institutions established in 1965
1965 establishments in Ontario
Universities in Ontario